Dr. Saeed Mohammed Al-Shamsi is a lawyer, diplomat, and a former assistant foreign minister for international organizations affairs with the rank of an ambassador. Ambassador Dr. Al Shamsi was UAE's former ambassador to Australia. He's married and has three children.

Academic Qualifications 

Ph.D in International Relations - College of International Services, American University, Washington.
M.A. in International Public Policy - Johns Hopkins University, Baltimore, Maryland.
Bachelor in Political Science - Arizona State University, Arizona.

Diplomatic career 

Dr. Al Shamsi started his diplomatic career in 1974 and held the following positions:

25/10/1981 - UAE Embassy in Washington, United States.
26/6/1988 - 12/3/1992 Ambassador to the Federal Republic of Germany.
31/1/1989 – 12/3/1992 Non Resident Ambassador to the Kingdom of Norway.
10/2/1989 – 12/3/1992 Non Resident Ambassador to the Republic of Finland.
16/3/1989 – 12/3/1992 Non Resident Ambassador to the Kingdom of Denmark.
28/4/1989 – 12/3/1992 Non Resident Ambassador to the Kingdom of Sweden.
25/8/2001 - 30/8 /2004 Ambassador to the Republic of India.
6/12/2004 - Ambassador to the Commonwealth of Australia.
12/07/2005 - Ambassador to New Zealand.

Attendance in International Conferences 
Participated in several Regional and International Conferences.
Participated in meetings of the 58th Session of UN General Assembly.

References

Living people
Ambassadors of the United Arab Emirates to Australia
Ambassadors of the United Arab Emirates to New Zealand
Ambassadors of the United Arab Emirates to Norway
Ambassadors of the United Arab Emirates to Finland
Ambassadors of the United Arab Emirates to Denmark
Ambassadors of the United Arab Emirates to Sweden
Ambassadors of the United Arab Emirates to India
Year of birth missing (living people)
Arizona State University alumni
Johns Hopkins University alumni
American University School of International Service alumni